Lists of Northern Hemisphere tropical cyclone seasons provides regional indexes to lists of articles about tropical cyclone seasons that occurred in the Northern Hemisphere.
They include:

Atlantic hurricane
 Atlantic hurricane season
Pacific hurricane
 Pacific hurricane season
Typhoon
 Pacific typhoon season
North Indian Ocean tropical cyclone
 North Indian Ocean cyclone season